The Statute Law Revision Act (Northern Ireland) 1954 (c 35) (NI) is an Act of the Parliament of Northern Ireland.

This Act is one of the Statute Law Revision Acts (Northern Ireland) 1952 to 1954.

Schedule
The Schedule was repealed by section 1 of, and Part II of the Schedule to, the Statute Law Revision (Northern Ireland) Act 1973.

The entries relating to the General Prisons (Ireland) Act in Part I of the Schedule were repealed by section 1 of, and Part VIII of the Schedule to, the Statute Law Revision (Northern Ireland) Act 1980.

Footnotes

Sources

External links
The Statute Law Revision Act (Northern Ireland) 1954, as amended, from the National Archives.

Acts of the Parliament of Northern Ireland 1954